South Pole is a Swiss carbon finance consultancy founded in 2006 in Zurich, Switzerland. South Pole's business covers project and technology finance, data and advisory on sustainability risks and opportunities, as well as the development of environmental commodities such as carbon and renewable energy credits. The company has 23 offices across Europe, Africa, Asia Pacific, North America and South America.

Timeline 

South Pole was founded in 2006 by graduates of the Swiss Federal Institute of Technology (ETH) including Patrick Bürgi, Thomas Camerata, Renat Heuberger, Ingo Puhl, and Christoph Sutter, and joined by Christoph Grobbel, Marco Hirsbrunner, and Christian Dannecker as equal partners. The company originally started as a spin-off from the ETH Zurich as the non-profit, ‘myclimate.’

Following the success of myclimate, the founders decided to position climate change as a business opportunity, and ‘South Pole Carbon’ was born. The company rebranded to ‘South Pole Group’ in 2015, and then again to the current ‘South Pole’ in January 2018.

In 2012, South Pole acquired a major stake in Australian carbon farming project developer and offset retailer, Sydney-based Climate Friendly. In 2017, the company acquired Climate Friendly's domestic and international carbon and renewables division outright, which at that point was a majority-owned subsidiary of the South Pole. In 2019, South Pole sold its majority share in Climate Friendly back to the Australian subsidiary's management team.

In 2021, a 10% stake in the South Pole was bought by Lightrock, a leading global impact investor backed by LGT and the Princely House of Liechtenstein. The investment was reported to be in the range of “€20 million-plus.” Also in 2021, South Pole acquired Belgium-based climate consultancy CO2logic to expand its offerings in Belgium and France. This was followed in 2022 by the acquisition of Italy-based Carbonsink, with offices in Milan, Florence, and Maputo.

Projects 
South Pole has developed more than 1000 projects in over 50 countries, including reforestation and forest protection, renewable energy, habitat restoration, clean cookstoves, and other project types.

Notable Clients and Partnerships 
South Pole has provided services or provided offsets to major companies including Nestlé, Gucci, EY, Hilton, and ALDO Group.

Notable partnerships include working with ebay.de to allow customers to offset the emissions of purchases.

Awards 
South Pole is a regular winner of a number of Environmental Finance’s Annual Voluntary Carbon Market Rankings, including four awards in both 2018 and 2019, one award in 2020, and three awards in 2021, including as Best Project Developer in the new category of Blue Carbon.

References 

Service companies of Switzerland
Financial services companies established in 2006
Carbon finance
B Lab-certified corporations